Minuscule 124 (in the Gregory-Aland numbering), ε 1211 (Von Soden numbering), is a Greek minuscule manuscript of the New Testament Gospels, on 188 thick parchment leaves (21.7 by 18.8 cm). The manuscript has been palaeographically assigned to the 11th century. It has marginalia and liturgical matter. The manuscript is cited in editions of the Novum Testamentum Graece.

Description 

The codex contains the text of the four Gospels. The text is written in two columns per page, 25-28 lines per page. The initial letters are written in red and blue.
It was corrected by the first hand.

There is also a division according to the smaller Ammonian Sections with references to the Eusebian Canons (written below Ammonian Section numbers), and the harmony written at the bottom.

According to the colophon, the Gospel of Matthew was written in Hebrew 8 years after the Lord's Ascension, that of Mark was written in Latin 10 years after the Ascension, Luke, in Greek, 15 years after, and John 32 years after.

Though containing the text of the Gospels, a binder has muddled up the folia, causing Matthew 18:25-23:35 to be placed after Matt 8:3, Mark 9:39-13:34 to be placed between John 14:18-19, and Luke 23:31-24:28 to be after Matt 23:35 before it returns to Matt 8:4, resulting in several issues of pagination

Text 

The text of Luke 22:43-44 is transferred to follow after Matthew 26:39. The pericope de adulterae (John 7:53-8:11) is not placed in the Fourth Gospel, but after Luke 21:38.

The Greek text of this codex has been considered a representative of the Caesarean text-type. Kurt Aland placed it in Category III. It is considered to belong to the textual family Ferrar Group/ƒ13. However, according to the Claremont Profile Method, it is a weak member of ƒ13.

The manuscript was considered by Birch as the best of the Vienna codices.

History 

The manuscript is dated by the INTF to the 11th century.

The manuscript was written in southern Calabria. According to Scrivener "the manuscript was written in Calabria, where it belonged to a certain Leo [i.e. Leo "Hamartolos"], and was brought to Vienna probably in 1564". The person responsible for bringing it to Vienna was Sambucus, the imperial librarian. It once belonged to Zacharias of Taranto.

The manuscript was added to the list of New Testament manuscripts by Griesbach. It was examined by Treschow, Alter, Birch, Ferrar, Abbott, C. R. Gregory (1887), and Kirsopp & Silva Lake. Alter used it in his edition of the Greek text of the New Testament. It was collated by Ferrar. J. Rendel Harris found some affinities with the Old Syriac version.

Currently the codex is located in the Austrian National Library (Theol. Gr. 188) at Vienna.

See also 

 List of New Testament minuscules
 Biblical manuscripts
 Family 13

References

Further reading 

 W. H. Ferrar, "A Collation of Four Important Manuscripts of the Gospels", ed. T. K. Abbott (Dublin: Macmillan & Co., 1877).
 J. Rendel Harris, "On the Origin of the Ferrar Group" (Cambridge, 1893).
 E. A. Hutton, "Excursus on the Ferrar Group", in "An Atlas of Textual Criticism" (Cambridge, 1911), pp. 49–53.
 Jacob Geerlings, "Singular Variants in 124", S & D XXI, pp. 108–111.
 Kirsopp and Silva Lake, Family 13 (The Ferrar Group). The Text according to Mark (London: Christophers, 1941), pp. 16–18.
 Hutter, Irmgard. Corpus der byzantinischen Miniaturenhandschriften. 5 vols. Stuttgart: Hiersemann, 1977–1997, 5:40-42.

External links 
 Minuscule 124 at the Encyclopedia of Textual Criticism
 Digital image of the first page of the Gospel of John in minuscule 124 online at the Austrian National Library.
 Online images of minuscule 124 (Digital Microfilm) at the CSNTM

Greek New Testament minuscules
11th-century biblical manuscripts
Biblical manuscripts of the Austrian National Library
Family 13